Colin Eales (born 3 July 1944) is a former Australian rules footballer who played with Geelong in the Victorian Football League (VFL).

Eales spent much of his early years at Geelong in the seconds, after coming to the club from Hamilton. He was a member of Geelong's 1963 and 1964 reserves premierships. It wasn't until 1966 that he was regularly picked in the seniors, playing 18 of a possible 19 VFL games that year followed by all 21 in 1967. He often played as a wingman or rover, but was on a half forward flank in the 1967 VFL Grand Final, which Geelong lost to Richmond.

Once he left Geelong he went on to become a coach in country football. He had his first assignment at Stawell and was also senior coach of Cranbourne.

References

1944 births
Australian rules footballers from Victoria (Australia)
Geelong Football Club players
Living people